The Wintu (also Northern Wintun) are Native Americans who live in what is now Northern California. They are part of a loose association of peoples known collectively as the Wintun (or Wintuan).  Others are the Nomlaki and the Patwin.  The Wintu language is part of the Penutian language family.

Historically, the Wintu lived primarily on the western side of the northern part of the Sacramento Valley, from the Sacramento River to the Coast Range.  The range of the Wintu also included the southern portions of the Upper Sacramento River (south of the Salt Creek drainage), the southern portion of the McCloud River, and the upper Trinity River. They also lived in the vicinity of present-day Chico, on the west side of the river extending to the Coast Ranges. Today most Wintus live on reservations and rancherias in Colusa, Glenn, Yolo, Mendocino, and Shasta counties.

History

The first recorded encounter between Wintu and Euro-Americans dates from the 1826 expedition of Jedediah Smith, followed by an 1827 expedition led by Peter Skene Ogden.  Between 1830 and 1833, many Wintu died from a malaria epidemic that killed an estimated 75% of the indigenous population in the upper and central Sacramento Valley.

In the following years, the weakened Wintu fell victim to competition for resources by incoming European-American settlers.  The settlers' sheep and cattle herds destroyed the Wintu food supply while gold miners' processing activities caused pollution of rivers.  The Wintu were also forced to work as laborers in gold mining operations. In 1846, John C. Frémont and Kit Carson accompanied by local white settlers killed 175 Wintu and Yana by force of arms

Settlers tried to take over Wintu land and relocate them west of Clear Creek.  At a "friendship feast" in 1850, settlers  served poisoned food to local natives, from which 100 Nomsuu and 45 Wenemem Wintu died.  More deaths of Wintu and destruction of their land followed in 1851 and 1852, in incidents such as the Bridge Gulch Massacre.

Culture
The Wintu language is one of the Wintuan languages; it is also called Wintu.

The religious stories and legends of the Trinity River Wintu were told by Grant Towendolly to Marcelle Masson, who published them in A Bag of Bones (1966).

Population

Scholars have disagreed about the historic population of the tribes before European-American contact.  Alfred L. Kroeber estimated the combined 1770 population of the Wintu, Nomlaki, and Patwin as 12,000.  Sherburne F. Cook initially put the population of the Wintu proper as 2,950, but later nearly doubled his estimate to 5,300.  Frank R. LaPena estimated a total of 14,250 in his work of the 1970s.

Kroeber estimated the population of the Wintu, Nomlaki, and Patwin in 1910 as about 1,000. Today the population has recovered somewhat and there are about 2,500 Wintun, many of whom live on the Round Valley Reservation, and on the Colusa, Cortina, Grindstone Creek, Redding, and Rumsey rancherias.

See also
 Winnemem Wintu
 Wintun
 Wintu language
 Nomlaki
 Patwin
 Wintuan languages
 Wintu-Nomlaki traditional narratives

Notes

References
 Christopher Chase-Dunn, Christopher K., and Kelly M. Mann. 1998. The Wintu and Their Neighbors: A Very Small World-system in Northern California. University of Arizona Press, Tucson. .
 
 
 Demetracopoulou, Dorothy. 1935. "Wintu Songs". Anthropos 30:483-494.
 Du Bois, Cora A. 1935. "Wintu Ethnography", University of California Publications in American Archaeology and Ethnology 36:1-148.
 Du Bois, Cora A., and Dorothy Demetracopoulou. 1931. "Wintu Myths", University of California Publications in American Archaeology and Ethnology 28:279-403.
 Hogue, Helen S., and Margaret Guilford-Kardell. 1977. Wintu Trails. Revised edition; originally published in 1948. Shasta Historical Society, Reading, California.
 Hoveman, Alice R. 2002. Journey to Justice: The Wintu People and the Salmon. Turtle Bay Exploration Park, Redding, California. .
 Kroeber, A. L. 1925. Handbook of the Indians of California. Bureau of American Ethnology Bulletin No. 78. Washington, D.C.
 LaPena, Frank R. 1978. "Wintu", in California, edited by Robert F. Heizer, pp. 324–340. Handbook of North American Indians, William C. Sturtevant, general editor, vol. 8. Smithsonian Institution, Washington, D.C.
 LaPena, Frank R. 1987. The world is a Gift. Limestone Press, San Francisco.
 LaPena, Frank R. 2004. Dream Songs and Ceremony: Reflections on Traditional California Indian Dance. Great Valley Books, Berkeley, California. .
 McLeod, Christopher. 2001. In the Light of Reverence. Videocassette. Bullfrog Films, Oley, Pennsylvania. .
 McKibbin, Grace, and Alice Shepherd. 1997. In My Own Words: Stories, Songs, and Memories of Grace McKibbin, Wintu. Heyday Books, Berkeley, California. .
 Towendolly, Grant. 1966. A Bag of Bones: The Wintu Myths of a Trinity River Indian. Edited by Marcelle Masson. Naturegraph, Oakland, California. ; .

External links
 "Wintu" , College of the Siskiyous
 "Native Tribes, Groups, Language Families and Dialects of California in 1770", (map after Kroeber)," California PreHistory
 "Wintu language", Ethnologue

California genocide
Native American tribes in California
History of Butte County, California
History of Colusa County, California
History of Glenn County, California
History of Mendocino County, California
History of Napa County, California
History of Shasta County, California
History of Tehama County, California
History of Yolo County, California
Sacramento Valley